The Cowpens flag, or 3rd Maryland flag, is an early version of the United States flag that meets the congressional requirements of the Flag Resolution of 1777. Like the Betsy Ross flag, the white stars are arranged in a circle on a blue field; but the circle consists of just 12 stars, with the 13th star in the center.

Description
This version of the US flag was said to have been carried by William Batchelor of the 3rd Maryland Regiment at the Battle of Cowpens, January 17, 1781, and this arrangement of stars has come to be known as the "3rd Maryland design."  The Batchelor family donated their original flag, known as the Batchelor Flag, to the 'Society of the War of 1812' in 1894.  After William N. Batchelor challenged the authenticity of the flag, however, the Baltimore Society of the War of 1812 appointed J. Appleton Wilson to research the history.  Wilson determined that the flag was actually carried by Joshua F. Batchelor at the Battle of North Point during the War of 1812, where it acquired its many bullet holes.  The society had later used the flag to mark the anniversary of the Battle of North Point, but had also used the flag for ceremonies regarding the American Revolution, including a parade for Lafayette when he visited Maryland in 1824.

The Batchelor Flag was on display in the Maryland Statehouse flag room until the 1980s, when older flags were moved to storage for preservation.  It is currently held at the Maryland Archives.  A 1970s study conducted by the Maryland State Archivist and the Smithsonian Institution, however, concluded that the preserved flag was of 19th-century origin.  Among the reasons for this conclusion are:

The 3rd Maryland Regiment was not at the Battle of Cowpens.
No American regiment was officially authorized to carry Stars and Stripes flags.
The first Stars and Stripes flag constructed in Maryland was made in 1782, at least a year after the Battle of Cowpens.
The fabric and construction technique match other 19th century flags.

A Smithsonian publication acknowledges that the Cowpens design may date to the American Revolution, but the actual flag held at Maryland dates no earlier than 1843.

The flag of Easton, Pennsylvania reverses the 3rd Maryland design, with the star wreath on the field of the flag, and the 13 red and white stripes in the canton.

The star pattern was popular enough to see continued use in 15-star flags as the nation began to grow.  A surviving military commission signed by Thomas Jefferson in 1808 shows a 15-star flag and a 15-star Navy jack, both using the 3rd Maryland star arrangement (14 star circle with the 15th star in the center).

The crest of the Navy cruiser USS Cowpens (CG-63) features the 3rd Maryland star pattern in the foreground, as well as two Cowpens flags in the background.

Media 

In the video game series Fallout, the flag of the United States of America is very similar to the Cowpens flag. The difference is the center stars. While the Cowpens flag has 12 stars and one center star, the Fallout-American flag has either 12 or 13 stars (depending on the game) encircling one larger star (representing the federal government and nation as a whole). The games take place in an alternate timeline that diverges from reality after World War II. The flag change represents a restructuring of the U.S. from the fifty states of real-life to thirteen commonwealths comprising at least two former states each as well as Canada following its annexation.

It is unknown, however, if the Cowpens flag is the inspiration for the Fallout-American flag, but the two flags are indeed similar.

Notes

Sources 
Cooper, Grace Rogers (1973). Thirteen Star Flags.  Smithsonian Institution Press.جعفر   Available online (21.7 MB).
 
Leepson, Marc (2004). Flag: An American Biography. 
Mastai, Boleslaw and Marie-Louise D'Otrange (1973). The Stars and the Stripes: The American Flag as Art and as History from the Birth of the Republic to the Present. Alfred A. Knopf, New York.

External links
Cowpens Flag at CRW Flags.
Historical flags at USHistory.org
Maryland State Archives list (dated 1940-1941) of flags in collection

Flags of the American Revolution